Franklin County High School is a high school located at 833 Bypass Road in Winchester, Tennessee.  It is operated by the Franklin County School District.

History

The school was located on the boulevard in winchester until 2006, where it was moved on the bypass. The old high school still holds a stadium and county offices such as the electoral commission. A petition circulated in 2020 to remove the rebel mascot, however ultimately failed in a school board vote. <herald chronicle><https://www.heraldchronicle.com/news/local/rebels-name-mascot-live-on-in-5-3-vote/article_4307b952-0cf1-11eb-bc7e-43796ae3c039.html>

Administrators
Principal - Dr.Roger Alsup
Assistant Principals
Ken Bishop
Jim Carr
Jeannie Miller

Athletics
Students may participate in a variety of athletic programs:
Baseball - Boys - Spring
Basketball - Boys and Girls - Winter
Cheerleading - Girls - Fall and Winter (Football, Basketball)(
Cross Country - Boys and Girls - Fall
Football - Boys - Fall
Golf - Boys and Girls - Fall
Soccer - Boys and Girls - Girls in fall, Boys in Spring
Softball - Girls - Spring
Swimming - Boys and Girls - Winter
Tennis - Boys and Girls - Spring
Track and Field - Boys and Girls - Spring
Volleyball - Girls - Fall
Wrestling - Girls - Winter
Marching Band - Boys and Girls - Fall

Notable graduates
Phillip Fulmer - former football coach of the Tennessee Vols (1992–2008) and Athletic Director (2017-2021)
Jeff Hall - Tennessee Volunteer and St Louis Rams Place kicker
Tracy Hayworth - Tennessee Vols (1986–1989), Detroit Lions (1990–1995)
Eric Taylor - Minnesota Vikings (2005), Edmonton Eskimos (2008–2009) Toronto Argonauts (2010) BC Lions (2011-2014) Calgary Stampeders (2015–present)

References

Schools in Franklin County, Tennessee
Public high schools in Tennessee
1950 establishments in Tennessee
Winchester, Tennessee